Woolfolk is a surname. Notable people with the name include:

Aaron Woolfolk (born 1969), American film director, screenwriter and producer
Andre Woolfolk (born 1980), American football cornerback
Andre Woolfolk (musician) (1950–2022), American flautist, percussionist, alto saxophone, tenor saxophone, and soprano saxophone player
Austin Woolfolk (1796–1847), American slave trader
Butch Woolfolk (born 1960), former American football running back and kick returner
Corey Woolfolk (born 1983), American soccer forward who currently plays for the San Francisco Seals
Donna Woolfolk Cross (born 1947), American writer and the author of the novel Pope Joan, about a supposed female Catholic Pope from 855 to 858
Dorothy Woolfolk née Dorothy Roubicek (1913–2000), pioneering woman in the American comic book industry
Elliott Woolfolk Major (1864–1949), American lawyer and Democratic politician from Pike County, Missouri
Lewis Woolfolk (1896–?), American Negro league pitcher in the 1920s
Marie Woolfolk Taylor (1893–1960), one of the sixteen founders of Alpha Kappa Alpha Sorority